The Kano Peoples Party was a Nigerian political party in the first republic. Formed in 1963, it soon became the second largest opposition party in Northern Nigeria overtaking the United Middle Belt Congress. In 1966, the Party was proscribed along with other political parties by the military.

History
In 1963, an internal crisis within the government of Northern Nigeria led to the Abdication of the Emir of Kano, Sir Muhammadu Sanusi. This spurred a wave of Nationalist protest from young Kanoans who perceived the Governments actions as having infringed on the province's autonomy. In 1963 these protests turned into open political rebellion with Tijjaniyya Sufi's led by Abubakar Uba proclaiming the KPP and calling for complete Kanoan independence from Kaduna.
Kano being the largest province in the region quickly gave the KPP a formidable foothold in Regional politics and sparked a wave of reprisal attacks from the NPC dominated Provincial Native Authority 
Before the 1964 election all but a few members of the Party's National Committee had been imprisoned or were facing trial  this forced the party into an alliance with other Regional opposition parties in the Northern Progressive Front.

Proscription
By 1965 the KPP had withdrawn from the Northern Progressive Front and had decided to strictly pursue Kanoan independence, however on 15 January 1966, while preparations for the 1968 general elections were going on, Nigeria's First Republic was overthrown and all political parties in the country including the KPP were proscribed.

Legacy
In 1967, Kanoan Nationalism scored a reticent victory when The Kano Province was officially granted marginal autonomy as a state separate from the rest of Northern Nigeria and in 1982, the government of Kano under Abubakar Rimi and the People's Redemption Party ended the long Exile of Sir Sanusi.

References

1963 establishments in Nigeria
1966 disestablishments in Nigeria
Defunct political parties in Nigeria
Liberal parties in Nigeria
Political parties disestablished in 1963
Political parties established in 1963
Politics of Northern Nigeria